Sydney Olympic Park Athletic Centre is a multi-use stadium in Sydney Olympic Park, Australia. The capacity of the stadium is 5,000 spectators.  It also hosted the 1996 World Junior Championships in Athletics and served as the warm-up track for the 2000 Olympic Games, being connected by a tunnel to Stadium Australia, where the Olympic competition was held. Since 1994 it's been a frequent venue of the Australian Athletics Championships.

External links

Stadium information
Sydney Olympic Park Athletic Centre at Athletics Track Directory

Athletics (track and field) venues in Australia
Sports venues in Sydney
Sports venues completed in 1994
1994 establishments in Australia
Athletic 
Athletics in New South Wales